Welling railway station is situated in Welling, part of the London Borough of Bexley, and is served by the Bexleyheath Line,  from .

The station was opened with the line on 1 May 1895. The station is located in Station Road, just off Bellegrove Road (which becomes Welling High Street). This is one of the stations on the line with original buildings: the offices here are on the Up side of the station. There are ticket barriers to both entrances.

Services 

The typical off-peak service in trains per hour is:
 2 tph to 
 2 tph to London Cannon Street
 2 tph to 

During the peak hours, the station is served by an additional half-hourly service between Dartford and London Charing Cross.

Connections
London Buses routes 51, 89, 486, 624, 625, B15, B16 and night route N89 serve the station.

References

External links 

 Welling Website

Railway stations in the London Borough of Bexley
Former South Eastern Railway (UK) stations
Railway stations in Great Britain opened in 1895
Railway stations served by Southeastern